Ahmed Soufiane Ahmed Ali Abunora (born 9 August 1990) is a Qatari footballer who currently plays for Al-Gharafa and also Qatar national football team.

International career
al Abunora made his debut for the Qatar national football team during the 9th International Friendship Tournament held in December 2009 in a friendly game. He also played for Qatar during the 2009 Toulon Tournament.

He also represented Qatar in the 2010 Asian Games held in China.

References

External links 
Goalzz.com profile

1990 births
Living people
Qatari footballers
Qatar international footballers
Mesaimeer SC players
Al-Wakrah SC players
El Jaish SC players
Al Kharaitiyat SC players
Al-Duhail SC players
Al-Gharafa SC players
Qatari Second Division players
Qatar Stars League players
Association football goalkeepers
People from Doha
2015 AFC Asian Cup players
Footballers at the 2010 Asian Games
Asian Games competitors for Qatar